The 2017 LTP Charleston Pro Tennis was a professional tennis tournament played on outdoor clay courts. It was the first edition of the tournament and part of the 2017 ITF Women's Circuit, offering a total of $60,000 in prize money. It took place in Charleston, United States, from 1–7 May 2017.

Singles main draw entrants

Seeds 

 1 Rankings as of 24 April 2017

Other entrants 
The following players received wildcards into the singles main draw:
  Victoria Duval
  Claire Liu
  Emma Navarro
  Ronit Yurovsky

The following players received entry from the qualifying draw:
  Emina Bektas
  Lauren Embree
  Sabrina Santamaria
  Carol Zhao

The following players received entry by a lucky loser:
  Chanelle Van Nguyen

Champions

Singles

 Madison Brengle def.  Danielle Collins, 4–6, 6–2, 6–3

Doubles

 Emina Bektas /  Alexa Guarachi def.  Kaitlyn Christian /  Sabrina Santamaria, 5–7, 6–3, [10–5]

External links 
 2017 LTP Charleston Pro Tennis at ITFtennis.com
 Official website

2017 in American tennis
2017 ITF Women's Circuit
2017
LTP Charleston Pro Tennis
2017 in American women's sports